Lipiodol, also known as ethiodized oil, is a poppyseed oil used by injection as a radio-opaque contrast agent that is used to outline structures in radiological investigations. It is used in chemoembolization applications as a contrast agent in follow-up imaging. Lipiodol is also used in lymphangiography, the imaging of the lymphatic system. It has an additional use in gastric variceal obliteration as a dilutant that does not affect polymerization of cyanoacrylate.

Indications 
Recently, there has been an increasing interest in the use of Lipiodol as a therapeutic agent in the management of unexplained infertility, using a procedure called Lipiodol flushing. There have been a small number of studies that suggest that flushing the media through the tubes gives a short-term rise in fecundity in patients with unexplained infertility. A systematic review has suggested a significant increase in fertility, especially in those women who have endometriosis when using Lipiodol flushing.

Historically Lipiodol was often used as a contrast medium at hysterosalpingography (HSG: a procedure to determine tubal patency, used in the investigation of subfertility). It became less commonly utilized in the 1960s to 1980s because the more modern water-soluble media give images that are easier to interpret. There is also an important safety issue with Lipiodol in that intravasation (leakage) of the fluid into the venous system has caused complications in the past.

Composition 
Ethiodized oil is composed of iodine combined with ethyl esters of fatty acids  of poppyseed oil, primarily as ethyl monoiodostearate and ethyl diiodostearate. The precise structure is not known.

History 
Lipiodol was first synthesized by Marcel Guerbet in the Paris School of Pharmacy in 1901. Historically, Lipiodol was the first iodinated contrast agent (used for myelography by two French physicians, Jacques Forestier and Jean Sicard in 1921).

Lipiodol or ethiodized oil for interventional procedure, was solely produced and marketed by Guerbet until Vivere Imaging launched its ethiodized oil in the brand name Vividol in 2022.

References

External links
 

Radiocontrast agents